Helix pomatia, common names the Roman snail, Burgundy snail, or escargot, is a species of large, edible, air-breathing land snail, a pulmonate gastropod terrestrial mollusc in the family Helicidae. It is one of Europe's biggest species of land snail.

Distribution 

Distribution of H. pomatia includes:

Southeastern and Central Europe:
 Germany – listed as a specially protected species in annex 1 of the Bundesartenschutzverordnung.
 Austria
 Czech Republic – least concern species (LC): Its conservation status in 2004–2006 is favourable (FV) in the report for the European Commission in accordance with the Habitats Directive.
 Poland
 Slovakia
 Hungary
 Romania
 In southwestern Bulgaria up to an altitude more than 1600 m.
 Northern and central Balkans
 Slovenia
 Croatia
 Bosnia and Herzegovina
 Serbia
 North Macedonia

Western Europe:
 Great Britain: in the west and south of England in southern areas on chalk soils. Its common name in the UK is "Roman snail" because it was introduced to the island by the Romans during the Roman period (AD 43–410). In England only (not the rest of the UK), the Roman snail is a protected species under the Wildlife and Countryside Act 1981, making it illegal to kill, injure, collect or sell these snails.
 Central France
 Belgium
 Netherlands
 Switzerland

Northern Europe:
 Denmark – Listed as a protected species.
 Southern Sweden
 Norway
 Finland
 In central and southern parts of Sweden, Norway and Finland, isolated and relatively small populations occur. It is not native to these countries, but is likely to have been imported by monks from Southern Europe during medieval times.
 Latvia
 Lithuania
 Estonia

Eastern Europe:
 Belarus (western regions)
 Ukraine
 Moldavia
 Russia: introduced to Moscow, Kursk

Southern Europe:
 Italy (northern regions)
 Portugal
 Greece
 Spain (eastern and north-eastern regions).

Description 
The shell is creamy white to light brownish, often with indistinct brown colour bands. The shell has five to six whorls. The aperture is large. The apertural margin is white and slightly reflected in adult snails. The umbilicus is narrow and partly covered by the reflected columellar margin.

Ecology

Habitat 
In southeastern Europe, H. pomatia lives in forests, open habitats, gardens, and vineyards, especially along rivers, confined to calcareous substrate. In Central Europe, it occurs in open forests and shrubland on calcareous substrate. It prefers high humidity and lower temperatures, and needs loose soil for burrowing to hibernate and lay its eggs. It lives up to 2100 m above sea level in the Alps, but usually below 2000 m. In the south of England, it is restricted to undisturbed grassy or bushy wastelands, usually not in gardens; it has a low reproduction rate and low powers of dispersal.

Lifecycle 
Average distance of migration reaches 3.5–6.0 m.
This snail is hermaphroditic. Reproduction in Central Europe begins at the end of May.

Eggs are laid in June and July, in clutches of 40–65 eggs. The size of the egg is 5.5–6.5 mm or 8.6 × 7.2 mm. Juveniles hatch after three to four weeks, and may consume their siblings under unfavourable climate conditions. Maturity is reached after two to five years. The life span is up to 20 years, but snails die faster often because of drying in summer and freezing in winter. Ten-year-old individuals are probably not uncommon in natural populations. The maximum lifespan is 35 years.

During estivation or hibernation, H. pomatia is one of the few species that is capable of creating a calcareous epiphragm to seal the opening of its shell.

Conservation 
This species is listed in IUCN Red List, and in European Red List of Non-marine Molluscs as of least concern. H. pomatia is threatened by continuous habitat destructions and drainage, usually less threatened by commercial collections. Many unsuccessful attempts have been made to establish the species in various parts of England, Scotland, and Ireland; it only survived in natural habitats in southern England, and is threatened by intensive farming and habitat destruction. It is of lower concern in Switzerland and Austria, but many regions restrict commercial collecting.

Cultivation 

In Japan, the Mie Escargot Farm succeeded in the complete cultivation of Burgundy species (Pomatia).

Uses 
The intestinal juice of H. pomatia contains large amounts of aryl, steroid, and glucosinolate sulfatase activities.  These sulfatases  have a broad specificity, so  are commonly used as a hydrolyzing agent in analytical procedures such as chromatography to prepare the sample for analysis.

Culinary use and history

Roman snails were eaten by both Ancient Greeks and Romans.

Nowadays, these snails are especially popular in French cuisine. In the English language, it is called by the French name escargot when used in cooking (escargot simply means snail).

Although this species is highly prized as a food, it is difficult to cultivate and rarely farmed commercially.

Synonyms
 Helicogena inflata Hartmann, 1844 (junior synonym)
 Helicogena pomatia (Linnaeus, 1758) (chresonym)
 Helicogena pomatia brenaensis W. Blume, 1920 (junior synonym)
 Helicogena pomatia burmeisteri W. Blume, 1920 (junior synonym)
 Helicogena pomatia var. gesneri Hartmann, 1844 (junior synonym)
 Helicogena pomatia var. rustica Hartmann, 1844 (junior synonym)
 Helicogena pomatia var. sphaeralis Hartmann, 1844 (junior synonym)
 Helix (Helix) pomatia Linnaeus, 1758· accepted, alternate representation
 Helix eusarcosoma Servain, 1884 (junior synonym)
 Helix pomaria O. F. Müller, 1774 (junior synonym)
 Helix pomatia albida Moquin-Tandon, 1855 (junior synonym)
 Helix pomatia brunnea Moquin-Tandon, 1855 (junior synonym)
 Helix pomatia expansilabris Kobelt, 1906 (junior synonym)
 Helix pomatia parva Moquin-Tandon, 1855 (junior synonym)
 Helix pomatia quinquefasciata Moquin-Tandon, 1855 (junior synonym)
 Helix pomatia var. banatica Kimakowicz, 1890 (invalid; not Rossmässler, 1838)
 Helix pomatia var. christinae Kobelt, 1906 (junior synonym)
 Helix pomatia var. claudiensis Kobelt, 1906 (junior synonym)
 Helix pomatia var. compacta Hazay, 1880 (junior synonym)
 Helix pomatia var. costellata Kobelt, 1906 (junior synonym)
 Helix pomatia var. dobrudschae Kobelt, 1906 (junior synonym)
 Helix pomatia var. elsae Kobelt, 1906 (junior synonym)
 Helix pomatia var. gratiosa Gredler, 1892 (junior synonym)
 Helix pomatia var. hajnaldiana Hazay, 1880 (junior synonym)
 Helix pomatia var. kapellae Kobelt, 1906 (junior synonym)
 Helix pomatia var. lagarinae Adami, 1885 (junior synonym)
 Helix pomatia var. lednicensis Brancsik, 1888 (junior synonym)
 Helix pomatia var. luteola Kobelt, 1906 (junior synonym)
 Helix pomatia var. pannonica Kobelt, 1906 (junior synonym)
 Helix pomatia var. pedemontana Kobelt, 1907 (junior synonym)
 Helix pomatia var. piceata Gredler, 1890 (junior synonym)
 Helix pomatia var. pulskyana Hazay, 1880 (junior synonym)
 Helix pomatia var. radiata Ulicny, 1885 (junior synonym)
 Helix pomatia var. rhodopensis Kobelt, 1906 (junior synonym)
 Helix pomatia var. sabulosa Hazay, 1880 (junior synonym)
 Helix pomatia var. serbica Kobelt, 1906 (junior synonym)
 Helix pomatia var. solitaria Hazay, 1880 (junior synonym)
 Helix pomatia var. thessalica O. Boettger, 1886 (junior synonym)
 Helix pomatia var. transsylvanica Kobelt, 1906 (junior synonym)
 Helix promaeca Bourguignat, 1882 (junior synonym)
 Helix pyrgia Bourguignat, 1882 (junior synonym)
 Helix scalaris O. F. Müller, 1774 (junior synonym)
 Helix segalaunica Sayn, 1888 (junior synonym)

References 
This article incorporates public domain text from the reference.

Further reading 
 Blume, W. (1920). Einige mazedonische Schnecken. Archiv für Molluskenkunde, 52 (2): 89-92. Frankfurt am Main.
 Egorov R. (2015). "Helix pomatia Linnaeus, 1758: the history of its introduction and recent distribution in European Russia". Malacologica Bohemoslovaca 14: 91–101. PDF
  Roumyantseva E. G. & Dedkov V. P. (2006). "Reproductive properties of the Roman snail Helix pomatia L. in the Kaliningrad Region, Russia". Ruthenica 15: 131–138. abstract
 Bank, R. A.; Neubert, E. (2017). Checklist of the land and freshwater Gastropoda of Europe. Last update: July 16, 2017.

External links 
 Linnaeus, C. (1758). Systema Naturae per regna tria naturae, secundum classes, ordines, genera, species, cum characteribus, differentiis, synonymis, locis. Editio decima, reformata [10th revised edition], vol. 1: 824 pp. Laurentius Salvius: Holmiae
 Korábek, O., Juřičková, L. & Petrusek, A. (2015). Splitting the Roman snail Helix pomatia Linnaeus, 1758 (Stylommatophora: Helicidae) into two: redescription of the forgotten Helix thessalica Boettger, 1886. Journal of Molluscan Studies 82: 11–22
 Animal Diversity Web page

pomatia
Gastropods described in 1758
Taxa named by Carl Linnaeus
Edible molluscs